The Uruguay women's national volleyball team is the national team of Uruguay. The squad won the silver medal at the inaugural 1951 South American Championship in Rio de Janeiro, Brazil. The dominant forces in women's volleyball on the South American continent however became Brazil and Peru.

Results

FIVB tournaments
 1960 FIVB Volleyball Women's World Championship — 9th place
 1973 FIVB Volleyball Women's World Cup — 10th place

Pan-American Cup
2002 — did not participate
2003 — did not participate
2004 — did not participate
2005 — did not participate
2006 — did not participate
2007 — 11th place
2008 — did not participate
2009 — did not participate
2010 — did not participate
2011 — did not participate
2012 — 12th place

South American Championship
 2005 — 5th place
 2007 — 4th place
 2009 — 5th place
 2011 — 5th place
 2013 — did not participate
 2015 — 7th place
 2017 — did not participate
 2019 — 8th place

References
Sports123

Volleyball
National women's volleyball teams
Women's volleyball in Uruguay